The 2011 JSM Challenger of Champaign–Urbana was a professional tennis tournament played on hard courts. It was the tenth edition of the tournament which is part of the 2011 ATP Challenger Tour. It took place in Champaign, United States between 14 and 20 November 2011.

ATP entrants

Seeds

 1 Rankings are as of November 7, 2011.

Other entrants
The following players received wildcards into the singles main draw:
  Brian Baker
  Roy Kalmanovich
  Dennis Nevolo
  Steve Johnson

The following players received entry as a special exempt into the singles main draw:
  Mirza Bašić
  Jesse Levine

The following players received entry from the qualifying draw:
  Alex Bogdanovic
  Kevin Kim
  Peter Polansky
  John-Patrick Smith

Champions

Singles

Alex Kuznetsov def.  Rik de Voest, 6–1, 6–3

Doubles

 Rik de Voest /  Izak van der Merwe def.  Martin Emmrich /  Andreas Siljeström, 2–6, 6–3, [10–4]

External links
Official Website
ITF Search 
ATP official site

JSM Challenger of Champaign-Urbana
JSM Challenger of Champaign–Urbana
JSM Challenger of Champaign-Urbana
JSM Challenger of Champaign-Urbana
JSM Challenger of Champaign-Urbana